Craig Antonio Thompson (born January 13, 1969) is a former American football tight end in the National Football League who played for the Cincinnati Bengals. He played college football for the North Carolina A&T Aggies.

References

1969 births
Living people
American football tight ends
Cincinnati Bengals players
North Carolina A&T Aggies football players